Algo con una mujer is an Argentine 2020 crime film  written and directed jointly by Mariano Turek and Luján Loioco, as a loose adaptation of the theatrical play La Rosa, by Julio César Beltzer.

It was premiered on Cine.ar TV, and its VOD platform Cine.ar Play in June 2020, as Argentine Movie theaters were closed during the COVID-19 pandemic.

Plot 

In 1955, during a turbulent political situation in Argentina previous to the fall of Peronism, Rosa, a crime-stories fan housewife, witnesses the confusing murder of her neighbor. As she feels increasingly distant from her distant husband, a politic activist of the Justicialista party, Rosa will now live her very own crime story.

Cast 

 María Soldi as Rosa
 Abel Ayala as Vargas
 Mabel Vignau as Paulina
 Miriam Odorico as Mecha
 Oscar Lápiz as Salcedo

References

External links 
 Algo con una mujer on Cine.ar PLAY VOD
 

2020 films
2020 crime films
Argentine crime films
2020s Spanish-language films